These are the official results of the Men's 110 metres hurdles event at the 2003 IAAF World Championships in Paris, France. There were a total number of 34 participating athletes, with five qualifying heats, three semi-finals and the final held on Saturday 2003-08-30 at 18:00h.

Medalists

Final

Semi-final
Held on Friday 2003-08-29

Heats
Held on Thursday 2003-08-28

References
 

H
Sprint hurdles at the World Athletics Championships